The 2017 BMW PGA Championship was the 63rd edition of the BMW PGA Championship, an annual golf tournament on the European Tour, held 25–28 May at the West Course of Wentworth Club in Virginia Water, Surrey, England, a suburb southwest of London.

Trailing the leader by seven strokes after three rounds, Alex Norén scored a final-round 62 to win by two shots from Francesco Molinari.

Course layout

Field

Past champions in the field

Made the cut

Nationalities in the field

Round summaries

First round
Thursday, 25 May 2017

Second round
Friday, 26 May 2017

Third round
Saturday, 27 May 2017

Final round
Sunday, 28 May 2017

References

External links
Coverage on the European Tour's official site
Wentworth Club: Golf

BMW PGA Championship
Golf tournaments in England
BMW PGA Championship
BMW PGA Championship
BMW PGA Championship